OOTG may refer to:

 Order of the Garter, an English order of chivalry
 Out of the Grey, a Contemporary Christian music project